The Cypriot mouse (Mus cypriacus) is a species of mouse endemic to Cyprus. Its primary habitat seems to be the vineyards and fields of the Troödos Mountains region.

The mouse was recognized as a new species in 2004 by Thomas Cucchi, a research fellow at the University of Durham. It was formally described in 2006,12 October 2006, in Zootaxa.

The Cypriot mouse has characteristics that distinguish it from other European mice: bigger ears, eyes and teeth; DNA tests confirmed that it was a distinct species. It is native to Cyprus.

"All other endemic mammals of Mediterranean islands died out following the arrival of man, with the exception of two species of shrew. The new mouse of Cyprus is the only endemic rodent still alive, and as such can be considered as a living fossil," said Cucchi. Originally, Cucchi wanted to call it Mus Aphrodite, as Cyprus is the birthplace of Aphrodite according to Greek mythology.

References

Mammals described in 2006
Endemic fauna of Cyprus
Mus (rodent)
Rodents of Europe